Man-Made is the eighth studio album by Scottish alternative rock band Teenage Fanclub, released on 9 May 2005. It was released on the band's own PeMa label in Europe and on Merge Records in North America.

Recording
Guitarist Norman Blake said, "We'd liked what John McEntire had done on the Stereolab records, so we got in touch with him. He was up for it, and suggested we come to Chicago. We hardly took any equipment, just some guitars and a pair of drumsticks. We even borrowed a guitar from Jeff Tweedy. I'm glad we did, otherwise we'd have been fucked. We'd have had to buy one!" The album was mostly recorded and mixed at McEntire's Soma Electronic Music Studios, with
additional recording and editing at guitarist Raymond McGinley's home studio in Glasgow, and at Riverside Studios in Busby near Glasgow.

Track listing

Personnel
Teenage Fanclub
Norman Blake – vocals, guitar
Gerard Love – vocals, bass
Raymond McGinley – vocals, guitar
Francis Macdonald – drums

Additional musicians
John McCusker – violin, viola
John McEntire – piano on "Only with You"

Technical
John McEntire – engineer, mixing
Tim Iseler – engineer (Soma)
Nick Brine – engineer (Raymond's house, Riverside Studios)
Annabel Wright – artwork 
Peter Love – layout

References

Teenage Fanclub albums
2005 albums